The Lebanese ambassador in Beijing is the official representative of the Government in Beirut to the Government of the People's Republic of China.
'

List of representatives

References 

 
China
Lebanon